Uygur is a  Turkish name, and may refer to:

 a common Turkish surname, see Uygur (name).

Places
 Uygur, Amasya, a town in the District of Amasya, Amasya Province, Turkey
 Uygur District, a district of Almaty Region in Kazakhstan

See also
Uyghur (disambiguation)